This is a list of the gymnasts who represented their country at the 1972 Summer Olympics in Munich from 26 August to 11 September 1972. Only one discipline, artistic gymnastics, was included in the Games.

Female artistic gymnasts

Male artistic gymnasts

References 

Lists of gymnasts
Gymnastics at the 1972 Summer Olympics